Michael Brady is a retired soccer player who is an assistant coach for the Duke University men's soccer team. He previously coached the American University women's soccer team. He played professionally, both indoors and out, in the United States. He also earned three caps with the U.S. national team in 1984 and 1985.

Born in England, he represented the United States at international level.

Player

College
In 1981, Brady traveled from Coventry to Jacksonville, Florida for a trial with the Jacksonville Tea Men. On the advice of the coaching staff, he elected to attend college in the United States instead. After some thought, he chose American University, a private college located in Washington, D.C.. Brady spent four seasons with the AU Eagles as both a midfielder and forward. In 1985, the Eagles went to the championship match only to fall to UCLA in eight overtimes. Brady was a first team All American as a midfielder in 1983 and as a forward in 1985 and finished his career as the 1985. He was a second team All American in 1984, but his greatest honor came when he was named the 1985 SoccerAmerica college Player of the Year. He finished his collegiate career with 66 goals and 29 assists. He holds the season goal scoring record with 24 goals as a senior. In 1986, AU retired Brady's jersey number, 14. While he had not yet completed his degree requirements, like many athletes, Brady left school to pursue a professional career. However, he would return and earn a bachelor's degree in communications in 1992. In 2007, American University inducted Brady into its Athletic Hall of Fame.

In the summer of 1985, Brady played for the Club España of Washington, D.C. The amateur team won the 1985 National Amateur Cup.

Professional
When Brady entered the professional ranks, he began an itinerant journey through U.S. soccer. The 1980s and 1990s were characterized by players jumping from one failing indoor and outdoor club to another in an attempt to play the game they loved. Brady began his professional career with the Baltimore Blast of Major Indoor Soccer League (MISL). In 1985, he spent a season with the Los Angeles Heat of the Western Soccer Alliance (WSA) where he scored five goals, tied for eight on the alliance's goals list. In 1988 and 1989, he played with the Washington Diplomats of the American Soccer League (ASL), earning All Star status in 1989. In 1990, the ASL and WSA merged to form the American Professional Soccer League. In 1993, he played three games with the Tampa Bay Rowdies (APSL). In 1994, he signed with the Baltimore Blast. He played eleven games, then retired. In 1997, he came out of retirement to play one season with the Cape Cod Crusaders of the USISL.

National team
In 1983, Brady was a member of the U.S. soccer team at the 1983 World University games. He then earned three caps with the U.S. national team while still in college. His first cap came when he replace Jeff Hooker in a 30 November 1984 scoreless tie with Ecuador. A week later, he came on for Amr Aly in another tie with Ecuador. His last cap came, again as a substitute, this time for Dan Canter on 16 June 1985.

Coach
While with the Maryland Bays in 1991, Brady also served as the head coach for the American University women's soccer team. In 1993, he became the head coach of the boys' soccer team at The Potomac School in McLean, Virginia. He served in that capacity for four years before moving to Premier Soccer Associates which runs soccer camps and clinics. In 2000, he returned to American University where he became the coach of the women's team again. In 2008, he resigned his position at American to join Duke as the top assistant.

External links
Duke bio
AU bio

References

1964 births
Living people
All-American men's college soccer players
American Eagles men's soccer players
American Professional Soccer League players
American soccer coaches
American Soccer League (1988–89) players
American soccer players
American University alumni
Baltimore Blast (1980–1992) players
Baltimore Spirit players
Cape Cod Crusaders players
Duke Blue Devils men's soccer coaches
English footballers
English emigrants to the United States
Association football forwards
Association football midfielders
Los Angeles Heat players
Major Indoor Soccer League (1978–1992) players
Maryland Bays players
Penn-Jersey Spirit players
Footballers from Coventry
Tampa Bay Rowdies (1975–1993) players
United States men's international soccer players
USISL players
Washington Diplomats (1988–1990) players
Western Soccer Alliance players
United States men's youth international soccer players
English expatriate sportspeople in the United States
Expatriate soccer players in the United States
English expatriate footballers